Mandhali or Mandali is a village in Shaheed Bhagat Singh Nagar district of Punjab State, India. The village is administrated by Sarpanch an elected representative of the village.

Demography 
As of 2011, Mandhali has a total number of 328 houses and population of 1655 of which 916 include are males while 739 are females according to the report published by Census India in 2011. The literacy rate of Mandhali is 59.93%, lower than the state average of 75.84%. The population of children under the age of 6 years is 170 which is 10.27% of total population of Mandhali, and child sex ratio is approximately 635 as compared to Punjab state average of 846.

Most of the people are from Schedule Caste which constitutes 30.15% of total population in Mandhali. The town does not have any Schedule Tribe population so far.

As per the report published by Census India in 2011, 924 people were engaged in work activities out of the total population of Mandhali which includes 546 males and 378 females. According to census survey report 2011, 62.77% workers describe their work as main work and 37.23% workers are involved in Marginal activity providing livelihood for less than 6 months.

Education 
The village has a Punjabi medium, co-ed upper primary with secondary/higher secondary school founded in 1962. The schools provide mid-day meal as per Indian Midday Meal Scheme. The school provide free education to children between the ages of 6 and 14 as per Right of Children to Free and Compulsory Education Act.

Landmarks and history 
The village has a mausoleum called Rauza Mandhali Sharif. It has the tomb of Sayed-ul-Shaykh Hazrat Abdullah Shah Qadri which was built by himself. A fair is held at the Rauza in the month of June and July every year which is attended by people of all religions, castes and cultures. The mausoleum also has the tombs of Ali Ahmed Shah Qadri, Bhajan Shah Qadri and Gulam Bille Shah. Umre Shah Qadri is the present head of the shrine.

Transport 

See also 
List of villages in India
Mandali caste

References

External links 
 Tourism of Punjab
 Census of Punjab
 Locality Based PINCode

Villages in Shaheed Bhagat Singh Nagar district